Aberdeen High School may refer to:

Canada
 Aberdeen High School (New Brunswick), Moncton, New Brunswick

United States
 Aberdeen High School (Idaho), Aberdeen, Idaho
 Aberdeen High School (Maryland), Aberdeen, Maryland
 Aberdeen High School (Mississippi), Aberdeen, Mississippi
 Aberdeen High School (Washington), Aberdeen, Washington
 Central High School (Aberdeen, South Dakota)

See also
 Aberdeen (disambiguation)
 Aberdeen Grammar School, Aberdeen, Scotland